Luigi Bassi, Pesaro, 5 September 1766 – Dresden, 13 September 1825, was an Italian operatic baritone.

When writing his Life of Rossini, Stendhal tells of the time in 1813 when he met Bassi in Dresden and spoke of "Mr Mozart;" Bassi said he was entranced that someone should still refer to him as "Mr" Mozart. The affection he felt for the great master was thus clear to the casual visitor, but can also be understood from the importance of the roles he gave Bassi towards the end of his life.

At the age of just twenty, he sang the role of Count Almaviva at the Prague premiere of Mozart's Le nozze di Figaro, after which contemporaries said,

The people of Prague were so happy with this performance of the opera composed by "Mozard" that they asked Domenico Guardasoni, impresario of the Prague National Theatre, to organise another opera. Guardasoni wrote to Da Ponte and work began on Don Giovanni. It was only natural that Bassi was called upon to sing again, and the role of Don Giovanni was written specially for him (with several joking references to the performance given the previous year). He did not like Finch'han dal vino, and asked Mozart to write another number where he could show off his vocal talents to the best; Mozart wrote Là ci darem la mano for Bassi, who is said to have forced five re-writes until he was satisfied.

Bassi moved to Leipzig, and there he sang Papageno in the Magic Flute in 1793, but shortly afterwards his singing ability had deteriorated (although his acting ability was as great as ever). A newspaper article said of him:

Bassi moved to Prague, but the war forced him to seek protection from Prince Lobkowitz and he occasionally travelled to Vienna to sing. In 1814 he moved to Dresden, where he worked for the Italian company. He still sang Mozart roles, and he was popular with audiences, although his voice was beginning to fail. Until his death he would occasionally travel to Italy for singing engagements, but in later life only sang sacred works.

Further reading
 Freeman, Daniel E.  Mozart in Prague (2021). .
 Schneider, Magnus Tessing: "Mozart, Luigi Bassi, and 'Fin ch'han dal vino'". In Danish Yearbook of Musicology, Vol. 37 (2009), pp. 39–55.
 Schneider, Magnus Tessing: "Laughing with Casanova: Luigi Bassi and the Original Production of Don Giovanni". In Mozart in Prague: Essays on Performance, Patronage, Sources, and Reception, ed. Kathryn L. Libin, Mozart Society of America / Society for Eighteenth-Century Music, Prague 2016, pp. 403–19.
 Schneider, Magnus Tessing (2021). The Original Portrayal of Mozart's Don Giovanni. Abingdon and New York: Routledge. OPEN ACCESS
 Waidelich, Till Gerrit: "'Don Juan von Mozart, (für mich componirt.)' Luigi Bassi eine Legende zu Lebzeiten, sein Nekrolog und zeitgenössische Don-Giovanni-Interpretationen". In Manfred Hermann Schmid (ed.): Mozart-Studien, Vol. 10, Tutzing 2001, pp. 181–211.

References

1766 births
1825 deaths
People from Pesaro
Italian operatic baritones
Wolfgang Amadeus Mozart's singers